Guðmundur  or Gudmundur is an Icelandic male first name, sometimes shortened to Gummi or Gvendur.

The Icelandic surname Guðmundsson is a patronymic surname meaning son of Guðmundur. Guðmundsdóttir is a patronymic surname meaning daughter of Guðmundur.

Guðmundur may refer to:

Guðmundur Arason (1161–1237), 12th and 13th century Icelandic saintly bishop
Gudmundur S. (Bo) Bodvarsson (1952–2006), director of the Earth Sciences Division at the Lawrence Berkeley National Laboratory
Guðmundur Finnbogason (1873–1944), Icelandic philosopher
Gudmundur Fjelsted (died 1961), politician in Manitoba, Canada
Guðmundur Guðmundsson (handball) (born 1960), the coach of the Iceland national handball team
Guðmundur Gunnarsson (born 1945), Icelandic labour leader and father of Icelandic singer Björk
Guðmundur Steinn Gunnarsson (born 1982), Icelandic musician and composer
Guðmundur G. Hagalín (1898–1985), Icelandic writer
Guðmundur Jónsson (born 1953), Icelandic architect who lives in Norway
Guðmundur Kamban (1888–1945), Icelandic playwright and novelist
Guðmundur Þór Kárason (born 1974), founder of Wit Puppets
Guðmundur Kjærnested (1923–2005), commander in the Icelandic Coast Guard who took part in all three Anglo-Icelandic Cod Wars
Guðmundur Oddur Magnússon, Icelandic artist
Guðmundur frá Miðdal (1895–1963), Icelandic artist
 Guðmundur Pálmason (1928–2004), Icelandic geologist (and chess player) who developed the Palmason Model of crustal accretion
Guðmundur Sigurjónsson (born 1947), Icelandic chess Grandmaster
Guðmundur Steinarsson (born 1979), Icelandic international footballer
Guðmundur Andri Thorsson (born 1957), Icelandic editor, critic, and author
Guðmundur Torfason (born 1961), retired Icelandic footballer

Icelandic masculine given names